Signs of the Swarm is an American deathcore band from Pittsburgh, Pennsylvania formed in 2014. The band consists of drummer Bobby Crow, vocalist David Simonich, guitarist Jeff Russo and bassist Michael Cassese. They released their debut album Senseless Order on April 29, 2016, and their second album The Disfigurement of Existence on November 3, 2017. Their third album Vital Deprivation was released on October 11, 2019, and their fourth album Absolvere was released on September 24, 2021.

History

Formation, Senseless Order, and The Disfigurement of Existence (2014–2018)
Signs of the Swarm was founded in 2014 with the initial lineup of vocalist CJ McCreery, guitarists Rodney Fabiann and Cory Smarsh, bassist Collin Barker, and drummer Greg Charley. Fabiann's departure saw now-drummer Bobby Crow join the band as secondary guitarist in January of 2015. Soon after, Charley made his departure seeing Crow take position as drummer. Their debut full-length album, entitled Senseless Order, was released on April 29, 2016. The album drew influence from brutal death metal and slam. Senseless Order was mostly self-recorded and therefore received mixed reviews, but allowed the band to find their footing. Later that same year, they signed with Unique Leader Records.

Following the album's release, Barker departed the band. A lineup change followed which saw Crow take on role as bassist, while new member Jimmy Pino replaced Crow as drummer. With this lineup, Signs of the Swarm released their second album, The Disfigurement of Existence, on November 3, 2017, their first release on Unique Leader. It was received positively by fans and it introduced the influences of black metal and hardcore, which would shape their sound going forward. The album's release was preceded by the single “Final Phase”, featuring guest vocals by Dickie Allen of Infant Annihilator.

Departure of CJ McCreery and Vital Deprivation (2018–2020)
In 2018, vocalist CJ McCreery departed Signs of the Swarm to join New Jersey-based deathcore act Lorna Shore, after their original vocalist Tom Barber departed to join Chelsea Grin. The band issued a statement addressing McCreery's departure, saying the decision was mutual." They were briefly supported by vocalists David Simonich and Matthew Krawchuk while on tour with bands such as Traitors, Aborted, and Lorna Shore. Simonich would be announced as their permanent vocalist later that year.

Signs of the Swarm's third album, entitled Vital Deprivation, was released on October 11, 2019, serving as Simonich's debut with them as well as drummer Jimmy Pino's last album with them. It continued the sound they had previously explored on The Disfigurement of Existence. Some reviews were mixed, but the album found the band discovering new territories. Pino departed the band in May of 2019 while in studio causing Bobby Crow to return to his position as drummer.

Non-album singles, Absolvere and further lineup changes (2020–2022)
During the course of the COVID-19 pandemic, Signs of the Swarm released 2 non-album singles. The first, “Pernicious”, was released on October 20, 2020. The second, titled “The Collection”, was released on February 5, 2021, and featured guest vocals from Matt Honeycutt and Nick Arthur, of Kublai Khan and Molotov Solution, respectively. It would also be the first to feature new guitarist Jeff Russo, who joined the band full-time in early 2021 after initially being contacted to tour with them in 2020. Russo would also be involved in writing and recording their upcoming fourth album, according to a statement published later in the year.

On June 29, 2021, they announced their fourth studio album, Absolvere, which released on September 24, 2021, and premiered its first single and music video, “Totem”. About a month later on July 27, they released a second single, “Hollow Prison”, featuring Alex Erian of Despised Icon as a guest vocalist.

In August 2021, the band parted ways with longtime members Cory Smarsh and Jacob Toy following abuse allegations against them that surfaced on Facebook. Despite this, the band confirmed that Absolvere’s release and support tours would continue as planned. They released a final music video which was filmed previously in 2021, featuring one of the former members for the album’s closing track "Death Whistle." Michael Cassese would step in to handle bass duties for their forthcoming tours. He was later announced as a full-time member on June 6, 2022.

The band embarked on a release tour for Absolvere in September 2021 with opening acts Worm Shepherd and Ov Sulfur, and supported Born of Osiris that fall, alongside Shadow of Intent. In early 2022, they supported Fit For an Autopsy, alongside Ingested, Enterprise Earth, and Great American Ghost.

They played at the Chaos & Carnage 2022 tour, headlined by Suicide Silence and Carnifex, featuring further support from Lorna Shore, Upon A Burning Body, AngelMaker, and Distant.

Label change and future releases (2022 - present) 
On August 29, 2022, the band announced their signing with Century Media Records, ending their nearly 6-year long relationship with Unique Leader Records. In celebration, they also announced a new single and video titled “Unbridled”, which was released through Century Media on September 7.

Members 

Current members
 Bobby Crow – guitar (2015); drums (2015–2016, 2019–present); bass (2016–2019)
 David Simonich – vocals (2018–present)
 Jeff Russo – guitars (2021–present)
 Michael Cassese – bass (2022–present; touring 2021–2022)

Former members
 Jacob Toy – bass (2020–2021); guitars (2016–2020)
 CJ McCreery – vocals (2014–2018)
 Collin Barker – bass (2014–2016)
 Rodney Fabiann – guitars (2014–2015)
 Cory Smarsh – guitars (2014–2021)
 Jimmy Pino – drums (2016–2019)
 Greg Charley – drums (2014–202015)

Former touring members
 Matthew Krawchuk – vocals (2018)

Timeline

Discography

Albums

See also 

 Deathcore
 Lorna Shore

References 

American deathcore musical groups
Heavy metal musical groups from Pennsylvania
2014 establishments in Pennsylvania